Veni may refer to:
Veni Creator Spiritus, a hymn normally sung in Gregorian Chant and is considered the "most famous of hymns"
Veni Domine, Swedish Christian progressive doom metal band, founded 1987 
Veni Sancte Spiritus (sometimes called the "Golden Sequence"), a sequence prescribed for the Roman Catholic Mass of Pentecost
Veni, veni, Emmanuel, a Latin hymn for Advent based on the O Antiphons
Veni, Veni, Emmanuel (1992), a concerto for percussion and orchestra by James MacMillan based on the preceding hymn
Veni, vidi, vici, a remark reportedly made by Julius Caesar, translated as "I came, I saw, I conquered"
Veni Vidi Vicious, the title of a garage rock album by Swedish band The Hives
Veni Markovski (born 1968), Bulgarian Internet pioneer